Mountain Lake (Ontario) may refer to one of a number of lakes in Ontario, Canada with this precise name or to others with similar names.

Lakes with this name

 Mountain Lake (Algoma County) 
 Mountain Lake (Algoma County) 
 Mountain Lake (Algoma County) 
 Mountain Lake (Algoma County) 
 Mountain Lake (Frontenac County) 
 Mountain Lake (Frontenac County) 
 Mountain Lake (Grey County) 
 Mountain Lake (Grey County) 
 Mountain Lake (Grey County) 
 Mountain Lake (Haliburton County) 
 Mountain Lake (Haliburton County) 
 Mountain Lake (Haliburton County) 
 Mountain Lake (Hastings County) 
 Mountain Lake (Kenora County) 
 Mountain Lake (Kenora County) 
 Mountain Lake (Nipissing County) 
 Mountain Lake (Nipissing County) 
 Mountain Lake (Nipissing County) 
 Mountain Lake (Nipissing County) 
 Mountain Lake (Parry Sound County) 
 Mountain Lake (Peterborough County) 
 Mountain Lake (Renfrew County) 
 Mountain Lake (Simcoe County) 
 Mountain Lake (Sudbury County) 
 Mountain Lake (Temiskaming County) 
 Mountain Lake (Thunder Bay County) 
 Mountain Lake (Thunder Bay County) 
 Mountain Lake (Thunder Bay County)

Similarly named lakes

 Mountain Island Lake (Kenora County) 
 Lake on the Mountain (Prince Edward County) 
 Lake on the Mountain (Haliburton County) 
 Bear Mountain Lake (Hastings County) 
 Mountain Ash Lake (Algoma County) 
 Black Mountain Lake (Thunder Bay County) 
 Mount Baldy Lake (Algoma County) 
 Sandy Mountain Lake (Algoma County) 
 Great Mountain Lake (Sudbury County) 
 Mount Sinclair Lake (Timiskaming County) 
 Little Mountain Lake (Sudbury County) 
 Lake on the Mount (Lanark County) 
 Red Rock Mountain Lake (Renfrew County) 
 Little Mountain Lake (Nipissing County) 
 Little Mountain Lake (Timiskaming County) 
 Mountain Top Lake (District of Algoma County) 
 Little Mountain Lake (Frontenac County) 
 Three Mount Lake (Thunder Bay County) 
 Big Mountain Lake (Peterborough County) 
 Mount Lake (Kenora; Rainy River County) 
 Mount Lake (Kenora County) 
 Mount Lake (Algoma County) 
 Mount Lake (Thunder Bay County) 
 Northwest Mountain Lake (Kenora County) 
 Gold Mountain Lake (Kenora County)

See also
List of lakes in Ontario

References

Lakes of Ontario